Goodenia mimuloides  is a species of flowering plant in the family Goodeniaceae and is endemic to inland areas of Western Australia. It is a low-lying to ascending, densely hairy herb, with narrow egg-shaped, toothed or lobed leaves, and racemes of yellow flowers.

Description
Flowering occurs from June to October and the fruit is a more or less spherical capsule  in diameter.

Taxonomy and naming
Goodenia mimuloides was first formally described in 1897 by Spencer Le Marchant Moore in the Journal of Botany, British and Foreign. The specific epithet (mimuloides) means "Mimulus-like".

Distribution and habitat
This goodenia grows in mallee and open woodland in inland areas of Western Australia between Carnarvon and the Goldfields region.

Conservation status
Goodenia mimuloides is classified as "not threatened" by the Government of Western Australia Department of Parks and Wildlife.

References

mimuloides
Eudicots of Western Australia
Plants described in 1897
Taxa named by Spencer Le Marchant Moore
Endemic flora of Western Australia